Pekka Juhani Saarelainen (born 17 March 1967 in Helsinki, Finland) is a Finnish male curler.

He started curling in 1985 at the age of 18.

Teams

References

External links

Living people
1967 births
Sportspeople from Helsinki
Finnish male curlers
Olympic curlers of Finland
Curlers at the 2002 Winter Olympics
European curling champions
Finnish curling champions